

Buildings and structures

Buildings

 1470 – Church and lighthouse tower, Westkapelle, Walcheren, completed
 1471 – Provand's Lordship, Glasgow, Scotland, built.
 1472–1474 – The Ordos Wall, first substantial section of the Ming Great Wall of China, built
 1473 – Work on Cologne Cathedral west front and towers suspended until 19th century
 1474 – Nave vault of St. Stephen's Cathedral, Vienna, completed
 1475–1479 – Dormition Cathedral, Moscow, designed by Aristotele Fioravanti, built
 1479 – Munich Frauenkirche completed by Jörg von Halsbach

Births
 1475: March 6 – Michelangelo, born Michelangelo di Lodovico Buonarroti Simoni in Caprese, Tuscany, Italian sculptor, painter, architect, poet and engineer (died 1564)
 1475: September 6 – Sebastiano Serlio born in Bologna, Italian Mannerist architect and theoretician working in France (died c. 1554)

Deaths
 1472: April 25 – Leon Battista Alberti, Italian architect and polymath (born 1404)
 1472? – Michelozzo, Florentine architect and sculptor (born c. 1396)

References 

Architecture